Anastasia At Your Service (1982) is a young-adult novel by Lois Lowry. It is the third part of a series of books Lois Lowry wrote about Anastasia and her younger brother Sam. The first edition was illustrated by Diane De Groat.

Plot summary
A long, boring summer—that's what Anastasia has to look forward to when her best friend goes off to camp. She's thrilled when old Mrs. Bellingham answers her ad for a job as a Lady's Companion. Anastasia is sure her troubles are over—she'll be busy and earn money.

But she doesn't expect to have to polish silver and serve at Mrs. Bellingham's granddaughter's birthday party as a maid! As if that isn't bad enough, she accidentally drops a piece of silverware down the garbage disposal and must use her earnings to pay for it! Is the summer destined to be a disaster?

References

External links
Lowry's website
Complete list of books by Lowry

1982 American novels
American children's novels
Novels by Lois Lowry
1982 children's books